A by-election was held for one of the seats of the Australian House of Representatives electorate of Tasmania on 26 March 1902. This was triggered by the death of Frederick William Piesse on 6 March 1902. The writ for the by-election was issued on 11 March, nominations for candidates closed on 20 March.

Results

Aftermath
William Hartnoll was elected in the by-election, receiving nearly 58 per cent of the vote. When opposition leader George Reid received a telegram from the Freetrade Association of Launceston informing him of Hartnoll's impending victory, he proclaimed "Thanks! Hartnoll's triumph overshadows the inevitable fate of the Barton ministry."

Hartnoll's election was not without controversy. Under Tasmanian law, nominations from candidates were required to be signed by the candidate himself. Hartnoll's nomination paper was received and accepted by the Commonwealth electoral officer via telegram, and was not signed. J.C. Whitelaw, Hartnoll's Labour opponent in the by-election, challenged the election on legal grounds, and instructed his solicitors in Melbourne to lodge a petition and a deposit of £100 to the Supreme Court of Tasmania. The petition was referred by the Prime Minister Edmund Barton to the Elections and Qualifications Committee of the House of Representatives. After hearing the evidence, committee chair Sir Edward Braddon announced that the committee had found that Hartnoll had "committed an irregularity" by nominating via telegram, but that it was not considered a sufficient reason for disturbing the election.

References

See also
List of Australian federal by-elections

1902 elections in Australia
Tasmanian federal by-elections
1900s in Tasmania